Russell Brand's Ponderland is a British television comedy series which was broadcast on the TV station Channel 4, presented by comedian and actor Russell Brand. The show consists largely of Brand giving a series of monologues in a stand-up style, interspersed with old television and video footage. Repeats of the show are often shown on Channel 4's sister channel 4Music.

Episode guide

Series 1
Childhood (22 October 2007)
Science (23 October 2007)
Crime (24 October 2007)
Sport (25 October 2007)
Love (26 October 2007)
Holidays (27 October 2007)

Series 2
Pets (30 October 2008)
Family (6 November 2008)
Education (13 November 2008)
Food (20 November 2008)
Class (27 November 2008)

Christmas special
Christmas (21 December 2008)

Awards

DVD release
The first series of Ponderland was released on 10 November 2008 and includes footage of Brand from his youth and over 40 minutes of unseen stand up.

Season one of Ponderland is also part of the three disc set The Russell Brand Collection: Ménage A Trois which was released on 24 November 2008.

References

External links
Review, Leicester Mercury

2007 British television series debuts
2008 British television series endings
2000s British comedy television series
British stand-up comedy television series
Channel 4 comedy
Russell Brand